The Bellanwila-Attidiya Wetlands were declared a nature sanctuary on 25 July 1990, owing to the bio-diversity of the area and its contribution to controlling floods. The wetlands, which span over 930 acres, are endemic to the country and a paradise for migratory birds. Forty-four species of fish including six which are endemic to the country have been identified in the Bolgoda River which flows through the wetlands. The wetlands are also home to 21 reptilian species, 17 species of mammals and 10 butterfly species.

Birds 

 Lesser whistling teal (Dendrocygna javanica)
 Asian openbill (Anastomus oscitans)
 Purple heron (Ardea purpurea)
 Blyth's reed warbler (Acrocephalus dumetorum)
 Pallas's grasshopper warbler (Helopsaltes certhiola)
 Ashy prinia (Prinia socialis)
 Australian white ibis (Threskiornis molucca)
 Black-headed oriole (Oriolus larvatus)
 Western swamphen (Porphyrio porphyrio)
 Watercock (Gallicrex cinerea)
 Eurasian oystercatcher (Haematopus ostralegus)
 White-throated kingfisher (Halcyon smyrnensis)
 Stork-billed kingfisher  (Pelargopsis capensis)
 Black-winged stilt (Himantopus himantopus)
 Spot-billed pelican (Pelecanus philippensis) 
 White-breasted waterhen (Amaurornis phoenicurus)
 Ruddy crake (Laterallus ruber)

See also 

 Muthurajawela wetlands
 Kirala Kelle wetlands

References 

1990 establishments in Sri Lanka
Protected areas established in 1990
Protected areas in Western Province, Sri Lanka
Wildlife sanctuaries of Sri Lanka